Ataxia obscura is a species of beetle in the family Cerambycidae. It was described by Johan Christian Fabricius in 1801. It is known from Ecuador, Brazil and French Guiana.

References

Ataxia (beetle)
Beetles described in 1801